The anime series Noir was directed by Koichi Mashimo, written by Ryoe Tsukimura, and produced by Bee Train. It follows two young female assassins who embark on a journey to seek answers about their past. While at first they seem to be only vaguely connected to each other, developments throughout the episodes indicate that their lives have been intertwined since childhood.



Episode list

Releases

References

Episodes
Noir